Oligocrystalline material owns a microstructure consisting of a few coarse grains, often columnar and parallel to the longitudinal ingot axis. This microstructure can be found in the ingots produced by electron beam melting (EBM).

References

Crystallography